Patrik Puistola (born 11 January 2001) is a Finnish professional ice hockey right winger for Jukurit of the Finnish Liiga. Puistola was selected by the Carolina Hurricanes in the third round (73rd overall) of the 2019 NHL Entry Draft.

Playing career
Puistola made his Liiga debut for Tappara during the 2018–19 Liiga season, playing 16 games and registering one assist. He was drafted 73rd overall by the Carolina Hurricanes in the 2019 NHL Entry Draft.

During his second season with Tappara in 2019–20, Puistola played 24 games, notching just two assists, after a stint in the Mestis, Puistola was loaned to fellow Liiga clubs, Jukurit and KooKoo, to complete the season.

On 26 March 2020, Puistola left Tappara out of contract and transferred to JYP Jyväskylä signing a two-year contract.

During the 2022–23 season, having returned to Jukurit and in the midst of setting new career offensive highs, Puistola's NHL rights were traded by the Hurricanes to the Edmonton Oilers in exchange for Jesse Puljujärvi on 28 February 2023.

Career statistics

Regular season and playoffs

International

References

External links
 

2001 births
Living people
Carolina Hurricanes draft picks
Finnish ice hockey right wingers
Ice hockey people from Tampere
JYP Jyväskylä players
KooKoo players
Lempäälän Kisa players
Mikkelin Jukurit players
Tappara players